is an anime series based on the visual novels developed by Neko Works and published by Sekai Project. Taking place in a world where humans live alongside adorable catgirls, the series follows Kashou Minaduki and Shigure Minaduki, siblings who have a family of catgirls named Chocola, Vanilla, Coconut, Azuki, Maple, Cinnamon and Cacao. It is centered around work life at Kashou's pâtisserie and home life at Shigure's family house.

An all-ages anime OVA adaptation was released on Steam in December 2017; it became one of the top earners in Steam in December 2017.

An anime television series adaptation by Felix Film premiered from January 9 to March 26, 2020. The anime is licensed in English-speaking regions by Funimation, which was renamed into Crunchyroll after its parent Sony Pictures Television acquired the streaming service of the same name from AT&T in 2021.

Episode list

OVA
In July 2016, Sekai Project announced that it would be running a Kickstarter campaign to fund an all-ages Nekopara original video animation adaptation.  The campaign launched in December 2016, and reached its US$100,000 funding goal "mere hours" after launching. The campaign ended on Kickstarter on February 11, 2017, and raised US$963,376 from 9,322 backers, however, was extended in order to reach the final stretch goal. In March 2017, the campaign formally ended on Sekai Project's "slacker backer" service, and raised a total of US$1,049,552. On December 4, 2017, Sekai Project announced that the OVA would be released on December 26, 2017, however, was later moved to December 22, 2017 due to a shipping error by Tokyo Otaku Mode, the company responsible for physical goods.

The opening theme for the OVA is "Baby→Lady LOVE" by Ray, while the ending theme is "▲MEW▲△MEW△CAKE" by Kotoko.

A second OVA, based on the Nekopara Extra visual novel, was released alongside the visual novel on July 27, 2018. The ending theme for Nekopara Extra is Symphony by Luce Twinkle Wink☆.

Television anime
During the Comiket 95 event, it was announced that an anime television series adaptation was in production. The series is animated by Felix Film and directed by Yasutaka Yamamoto, with Gō Zappa handling series composition, Yuichi Hirano designing the characters, and Akiyuki Tateyama composing the music.  The first episode of the television anime premiered at Anime Expo 2019 on July 6, 2019, and the first two episodes aired at a special event in Tokyo on December 24, 2019. The series premiered from January 9, 2020 until March 26, 2020 on AT-X, Tokyo MX, and BS11.  The opening theme for the anime is "Shiny Happy Days" by Yuki Yagi, Iori Saeki, Shiori Izawa, Miku Itō, Yuri Noguchi, and Marin Mizutani. The series aired for 12 episodes. Funimation acquired the series for distribution in North America, the British Isles, and Australasia, streaming the series on FunimationNow, Wakanim and AnimeLab, and produced an English dub for the series.

Notes

References

External links
  
  
 

Lists of anime episodes